This article is about the history of the Arizona Diamondbacks. The Diamondbacks (often shortened as the D-Backs), an American professional baseball team based in Phoenix, Arizona, were formed in 1998, based at Bank One Ballpark. This followed five years of preparation under the leadership of Jerry Colangelo.  The Diamondbacks won the World Series championship in 2001, becoming the fastest expansion team in the Major Leagues to win a championship, doing so in only the fourth season since inception in 1998. Financial difficulties were then encountered and the home field was renamed to Chase Field in 2005, as a result of Bank One Corporation's merger with JPMorgan Chase & Co. After a lean period the team won the National League West division in 2011.

Franchise history

The desire for baseball in the desert
Between 1940 and 1990, Phoenix jumped from the 99th largest city in the nation to the 9th largest (it is currently the 5th largest). As such, it was frequently mentioned as a possible location for either a new or relocated MLB franchise. Baseball had a rich tradition in Arizona long before talk of bringing a big-league team even started. The state has been a frequent spring training site since 1946. With a large number of people relocating to the state from the Midwest and the Northeast, as well as from California, many teams (most notably the Chicago Cubs and the Los Angeles Dodgers) have normally had large followings in Arizona.

The first serious attempt to land an expansion team for the Phoenix area was mounted by Elyse Doherty and Martin Stone, owner of the Phoenix Firebirds, the city's triple-A minor league baseball team and the top affiliate of the San Francisco Giants. In the late 1980s Stone approached St. Louis (football) Cardinals owner Bill Bidwill about sharing a proposed 70,000 seat domed stadium in Phoenix. It was taken for granted that a domed stadium was a must for a major-league team to be a viable venture in the Phoenix area.

Bidwill, with plans already in the works to leave St. Louis, opted instead to sign a long-term lease with Arizona State University to use its Sun Devil Stadium as the home of his soon-to-be Arizona-based NFL franchise. Since baseball-only stadiums were not seen as fiscally viable during that era, this effectively ended Stone's bid.

In the fall of 1993, Jerry Colangelo, majority owner of the Phoenix Suns, the area's NBA franchise, announced he was assembling an ownership group, "Arizona Baseball, Inc.", to apply for a Major League Baseball expansion team. This was after a great deal of lobbying by the Maricopa County Sports Authority, a local group formed to preserve Cactus League spring training in Arizona and eventually secure a Major League franchise for the state.

Colangelo's group was so certain that they would be awarded a franchise that they held a name-the-team contest for it; they took out a full-page ad in the sports section of the February 13, 1995 edition of the state's leading newspaper, the Arizona Republic. First prize was a pair of lifetime season tickets awarded to the person who submitted the winning entry. The winning choice was "Diamondbacks", after the Western diamondback, a rattlesnake native to the region known for injecting a large amount of venom when it strikes. In addition to a write-in option, the four provided choices that did not win were the Arizona "Coyotes," "Phoenix," "Rattlers," and "Scorpions."

Colangelo's bid received strong support from one of his friends, Chicago White Sox and Chicago Bulls owner Jerry Reinsdorf, and media reports say that then-acting Commissioner of Baseball and Milwaukee Brewers founder Bud Selig was also a strong supporter of Colangelo's bid. Plans were also made for a new retractable-roof ballpark, Bank One Ballpark, nicknamed the BOB, (renamed in 2005 to Chase Field) to be built in an industrial/warehouse district on the southeast edge of downtown Phoenix, one block from the Suns' America West Arena (now Talking Stick Resort Arena).

On March 9, 1995, Colangelo's group was awarded a franchise to begin play for the 1998 season. A $130 million franchise fee was paid to Major League Baseball. The Tampa Bay Area was also granted a franchise, the Devil Rays (to be based in St. Petersburg), at the same time.

Arizona had originally been intended to join Tampa Bay in the American League.  However, five American League teams had threatened to block the league assignments because of concerns that they would have additional games out of their time zone, causing early starts that would decrease revenue and TV ratings.  Thus, on January 16, 1997, the Diamondbacks were officially voted into the National League while their expansion counterparts in Tampa Bay were voted into the American League. MLB reserved the right to unilaterally move either the Diamondbacks or Devil Rays to another league within the first five years of existence. After the 2001 season, with the possibility of the Twins and Expos being eliminated, it was possible the Diamondbacks would move to the American League. However, MLB's franchise contraction plans never materialized.

According to the original press release from Colangelo's group (which remained posted on the team website during the first few seasons) the chosen team colors were Arizona turquoise, copper, black and purple. "... Turquoise was chosen because the greenish-blue stone is indigenous to Arizona, copper because Arizona is one [of] the nation's top copper-producing states and purple because it has become a favorite color for Arizona sports fans, thanks to the success of the National Basketball Association's Phoenix Suns." The distinctive "A" logo and color scheme was developed by Campbell Fisher Ditko, a Phoenix-based graphic design firm (which also designed the now-iconic "Streaking Sun" logo for the Suns for the 1992 season).

In the earliest days, the Diamondbacks operated as a subsidiary of the Suns; several executives and managers with the Suns and America West Arena were brought over to the Diamondbacks in similar roles. As the expansion draft had yet to take place, there were no actual Diamondback players, so members of the Suns team, including team captain and three-time NBA All-Star point guard Kevin Johnson (who was actually drafted by the Oakland A's in 1986 as a shortstop; he chose to focus exclusively on his basketball career as a pro), Danny Ainge (who actually briefly played in Major League Baseball at the beginning of his career for the Toronto Blue Jays), Danny Manning and coach Paul Westphal, joined Colangelo and modeled the first prototype Diamondbacks uniforms, also designed by Campbell Fisher Ditko, at a publicity event in early November 1995. These uniforms and caps were immediately made available for sale to the public.

A regional team
From the beginning, Colangelo wanted to market the Diamondbacks to a statewide fan base and not limit fan appeal to Phoenix and its suburbs. Colangelo decided to call the team the "Arizona Diamondbacks" rather than the "Phoenix Diamondbacks". Although every Major League Baseball team does cultivate fans from outside its immediate metropolitan area, and even though the greater Phoenix area has 2/3 of the statewide population, there are long-standing historic rivalries between Phoenix and Arizona's other cities, such as Tucson, which at times diminish statewide appeal and enthusiasm for a Phoenix-based team.

A series of team-sponsored fan motor coach trips from Tucson to Bank One Ballpark were inaugurated for the opening season and are still in operation to this day (it is now known as the "D-backs Express"). The Diamondbacks are also known for the "Hometown Tour", held in January, where selected players, management and broadcasters make public appearances, hold autograph signings, etc., in various locations around Phoenix and Tucson, as well as many small and mid-sized towns in other areas of Arizona.

Despite their early efforts to appeal to the entire state, in 2009 the Diamondbacks moved their Triple-A Pacific Coast League farm team, the Tucson Sidewinders, to Reno, where they are now known as the Aces.  In 2011, they also moved their spring training base from Tucson to a new stadium near the Phoenix suburb of Scottsdale.

Further preparations
Two years before their first opening day, Colangelo hired the then-recently fired Buck Showalter, the American League Manager of the Year in 1994 with the New York Yankees, as the D-Backs' first manager.

Their lower level Minor League Baseball teams began play in 1996; the expansion draft was held in November 1997. The Diamondbacks would replace the above-mentioned Firebirds as the main baseball team in Phoenix; they would move south to Tucson and become the Sidewinders, serving as the AAA club for the new team.

1998–2002: Early success and a World Series championship
The Diamondbacks' first major league game was played against the Colorado Rockies on March 31, 1998, at Bank One Ballpark before a standing-room only crowd of 50,179. Tickets had gone on sale on January 10 and sold out before lunch. The Rockies won, 9–2, with Andy Benes on the mound for the Diamondbacks, and Travis Lee being the first Diamondbacks player to get a hit (a single in his first MLB at bat), then became the first Diamondback to score, homer and drive in a run in his second MLB plate appearance.

In their first five seasons of existence, the Diamondbacks won three division titles (1999, 2001, 2002) a National League pennant (2001) and a World Series championship (2001). In 1999, Arizona won 100 games in only its second season to win the NL West title. They lost to the New York Mets in four games in the NLDS.

Colangelo fired Showalter after a relatively disappointing 2000 season, and replaced him with Bob Brenly, the former Giants catcher and coach, who had up to that point been working as a color analyst on Diamondbacks television broadcasts.
In 2001, the team was led by two of the most dominant pitchers in all of baseball: Randy Johnson and Curt Schilling. Arizona had postseason victories over the St. Louis Cardinals (3–2 in the NLDS) and the Atlanta Braves (4–1 in the NLCS) to advance to the World Series where, in the wake of the September 11 terrorist attacks in New York City, they beat the three-time reigning champions, the New York Yankees, 4–3, to become the youngest expansion franchise to win the World Series (in just their fourth season of play). The previous mark was held by the Florida Marlins. This was the first time since  that the home team won all seven games of a World Series, and the Diamondbacks were the first National League team to do so.

An estimated orderly crowd of over 300,000 celebrated at the Diamondbacks victory parade, held at Bank One Ballpark and the surrounding downtown Phoenix streets on November 7, 2001. This was the first men's major professional sports championship for the state of Arizona and the first for a team (in the four major North American professional sports leagues) owned or controlled by Colangelo, whose basketball Phoenix Suns made it to the NBA Finals in 1976 and 1993 but lost both times.
The team finished the 2002 season with a 98–64 record and won their third NL West title in five years, but were swept out in the NLDS by the St. Louis Cardinals.  Randy Johnson was awarded with his fourth consecutive Cy Young Award as well the Major League Baseball Triple Crown.

2003–2005: Tough times and the end of the Colangelo era
Arizona ended the 2003 season with an 84–78 record, in 3rd place in the NL West.  Both Johnson and Schilling had suffered injuries during the season and Schilling was traded in the off season to the Boston Red Sox where he contributed to that team's 2004 World Series victory.

By this time, Colangelo and the other partners were embroiled in a dispute over the financial health and direction of the Diamondbacks. Notably, Colangelo had asked several key players on the 2001 World Series champions to defer their salaries; by 2004, they and others were owed $150 million. Colangelo's willingness to go into debt and acquire players through free agency had led to one of the quickest free falls in major sports history. In 2004, the Diamondbacks were only above .500 once all season, and by the end of June they were 28–50, their season all but finished. Just three years after winning the World Series and two years after winning their third division title in four years, the Diamondbacks had dropped to a dismal 51–111 record, the worst in Major League Baseball and one of the 10 worst records (in terms of losses) in the modern era.  This came despite Johnson pitching a perfect game on May 18 of that season. Brenly was fired partway through the season and was replaced on an interim basis by third base coach Al Pedrique. The .315 winning percentage is still the worst in franchise history.

Colangelo also did not finish out the season. He was forced to resign as managing general partner in the late summer of 2004. In a 2004 interview with columnist Hal Bodley of USA TODAY, Colangelo defended his actions:

Colangelo sold his general partnership shares to a group of investors who were all involved as partners in the founding of the team in 1995. The investors include equal partners Ken Kendrick, Mike Chipman, and Jeffrey Royer. Kendrick became managing general partner. Jeff Moorad, a former sports agent, joined the partnership, and was named the team's CEO; becoming its primary public face.

Following the 2004 season, the Diamondbacks hired Wally Backman to be the team's manager. Backman was formerly manager of the Class A California League Lancaster JetHawks, one of the Diamondbacks' minor-league affiliates. In a turn of events that proved to be a minor embarrassment for the reorganized ownership group, Backman was almost immediately fired after management learned, after the fact, of legal troubles and improprieties in Backman's past. Former Seattle Mariners manager and Diamondbacks bench coach Bob Melvin became the new manager after only a ten-day tenure for Backman.

Following the Backman incident, the Diamondbacks spent heavily on free agents in order to re-build. The club signed 3B Troy Glaus, P Russ Ortiz, SS Royce Clayton, and 2B Craig Counsell, among others. They then entered into a three-way deal with the New York Yankees and Los Angeles Dodgers: Randy Johnson was sent to the New York Yankees, for Javier Vázquez, Brad Halsey, and Dioner Navarro who was then dealt to the Dodgers for Shawn Green. Finally, they traded Casey Fossum to the Tampa Bay Devil Rays for José Cruz Jr. The Diamondbacks were considered by some to be the favorite to win the division after spending on the aforementioned free agents; however, injuries hurt the team's chances of reaching its expected potential.

The Diamondbacks, led by Melvin, finished the 2005 season with a record of 77 wins and 85 losses. Though a losing season, this was a 26-game improvement over 2004, and sufficient for second place in a woefully weak NL West, five games behind the San Diego Padres.

In May 2005, the Diamondbacks hired Derrick Hall from the Los Angeles Dodgers. He was named president of the club in September of the next year. In October 2005 the Diamondbacks hired 35-year-old Josh Byrnes, assistant general manager of the Boston Red Sox, to replace the outgoing Joe Garagiola Jr. as Diamondbacks General Manager. Garagiola took a position in Major League Baseball's main offices in New York City.

2006: Rebuilt and reloaded

In a weak NL West division, the Diamondbacks failed to improve on their 2005 performance, finishing fourth with a slightly worse record than the year before. The season did include two excellent individual performances, however. 2B Orlando Hudson became the recipient of his second career Gold Glove Award, as announced on November 3 becoming only the sixth infielder in major league history to win a Gold Glove award in both the American and National Leagues. On November 14, it was announced that RHP Brandon Webb was the recipient of the Cy Young Award for the National League. Webb, a specialist in throwing the sinkerball, received 15 of 32 first-place votes in balloting by the Baseball Writers' Association of America. Webb went 16–8 with a 3.10 ERA and in the 2006 season was named to his first All-Star team.

Several significant trades were made during the off season. The Diamondbacks and Brewers made a trade on November 25, 2006. Johnny Estrada, Greg Aquino, and Claudio Vargas were dealt to the Milwaukee Brewers for Doug Davis, Dana Eveland, and Dave Krynzel. On Sunday January 7, it was announced that Randy Johnson would return to the Diamondbacks on a two-year contract, pending a physical. He was obtained from the Yankees in exchange for Luis Vizcaíno, Ross Ohlendorf, Alberto González and Steven Jackson, with the Yankees paying $2 million of Johnson's $26 million salary. The Diamondbacks and Florida Marlins made a deal March 26 to acquire RHP Yusmeiro Petit in exchange for Jorge Julio and cash.

2007: A new look and a return to the playoffs

The Diamondbacks announced in early September 2006 that their uniforms, which remained largely unchanged since the team's first season, would be completely redesigned for the 2007 season. Details were supposed to be kept from the public until after the 2006 postseason as per MLB rules, but the Diamondback page from the 2007 MLB Official Style Guide was somehow leaked around September 25, and local media broadcast printed the new design for all to see. Of great surprise to many fans was a brand new color scheme; apparently the original colors used by the franchise since Major League Baseball awarded it to Jerry Colangelo's ownership group in 1995 were to be discontinued.

While some fans applauded the redesign, most of the reaction to the new color scheme, which included the changing of the historical purple and traditional Arizonan colors of copper and turquoise to a reddish color known as "Sedona Red" similar to those of the Coyotes and Cardinals color schemes, was pointedly negative. The official unveiling of the uniforms came at a charity event on November 8 in nearby Scottsdale, where several of the players modeled the uniforms on a runway, and posed for publicity photos. The distinctive "A" design remained unchanged save for the colors. The stylized snake-like "D" logo, also used since the early days for the road uniforms, was slightly redesigned and a completely new shoulder patch introduced. The lettering on the jerseys was completely redesigned. "Sedona Red" became the dominant color scheme used throughout Chase Field and in all marketing and promotional materials for the Diamondback ball club.

Not only did the Diamondbacks uniforms change, but many faces of the organization changed as well. Fan favorite and Diamondbacks stalwart Luis Gonzalez did not return as the left fielder for the Diamondbacks. The most popular player in franchise history, "Gonzo" signed a one-year contract worth just under $7 million on December 7 to play for the rival Los Angeles Dodgers for the 2007 season. Craig Counsell, Miguel Batista and Jay Bell, also signed with other teams, as did Thom Brennaman, the original Diamondbacks play-by-play man.

In the 2007 regular season, the Diamondbacks enjoyed success with a young team including Brandon Webb, Conor Jackson, Stephen Drew, Carlos Quentin, Chad Tracy, Chris Young, Miguel Montero, Mark Reynolds (called up from Double-A in May) and Justin Upton (called up from Double-A in August). Despite being outscored over the season, the Diamondbacks posted the best record in the NL with 90 wins and 72 losses.  Their unorthodox style led to the team adopting an unofficial motto coined by 1st baseman Tony Clark; "Anybody, Anytime." On September 28, the Diamondbacks defeated the Colorado Rockies to secure a position in the 2007 playoffs. After the Padres' defeat at the hands of the Milwaukee Brewers on September 29, the Diamondbacks secured both the NL West title and home field advantage throughout the NL playoffs.

After taking the first two games at home against the Cubs, in the National League Division Series, they took the series to Wrigley Field, where they completed their sweep, earning their first berth in the National League Championship Series since 2001.  In the NLCS, they faced the Colorado Rockies again.  The Rockies had been on an incredible winning pace since the All Star break, and they swept the Diamondbacks in four games.

2007 off season
On December 3, 2007, the Diamondbacks traded Carlos Quentin, who had failed to perform to expectation, to the Chicago White Sox for first base prospect Chris Carter.

On December 14, in a blockbuster trade, the Diamondbacks acquired starting RHP Dan Haren from the Oakland Athletics for six players: LHP Brett Anderson, LHP Dana Eveland and LHP Greg Smith; the above-mentioned just-acquired infielder Chris Carter; and outfielders Aaron Cunningham and Carlos González. The team also traded relief pitcher José Valverde, who led the major leagues in saves in 2007 with 47, to the Houston Astros for reliever Chad Qualls, RHP Juan Gutiérrez and IF/OF Chris Burke. Haren was 15–9 with a 3.07 ERA for Oakland in 2007. On August 5, 2008 Dan Haren signed a four-year, $44.75 million deal with the Diamondbacks worth a guaranteed $41.25 million through 2012 and including a $15.5 million club option for 2013 with a $3.5 million buyout.

2008–2010: Under performance and management changes

2008

After winning the opening game of the season on March 31 on the road against the Cincinnati Reds, the Diamondbacks found themselves with the best record in Major League Baseball, 20–8, by the start of May. At that time, they also led the NL West by 6.5 games. Despite the strong start, the team played poorly in May and June and entered the All Star break at 47–48, still leading the NL West.

Orlando Hudson underwent season-ending surgery on his left wrist August 9 in the wake of a collision with catcher Brian McCann of the Atlanta Braves. Hudson was due to become a free agent at the end of the season and would not be re-signed. LF Eric Byrnes was on the 60-day disabled list from late June, with a torn left hamstring, and was out for the remainder of the season.

On August 11, 2008, Dallas Buck, RHP Micah Owings, and C Wilkin Castillo were traded to the Reds (in last place in the NL Central at the time) in exchange for OF Adam Dunn. Dunn, who was tied for the major league lead with 32 home runs, was expected to provide a significant boost to an offense that has struggled to score runs for most of the season. Dunn seemed quite positive about being traded to a ball club in first place in its division in August. The move was seen by some fans as a belated attempt by the D-backs to counter the trade by their division rival, the Los Angeles Dodgers, for Boston Red Sox power-hitting OF Manny Ramirez on July 31 and also to compensate for the injuries to Hudson and Byrnes, generally considered two of the more "power-hitting" Diamondbacks on a team which has relied heavily on pitching and defense in recent years. A free agent at the end of the season, on February 11, 2009, Dunn agreed to a two-year $20 million contract with the Washington Nationals. On August 31, the Diamondbacks acquired former World Series MVP David Eckstein to fill the hole at second base which was opened after Orlando Hudson was placed on the disabled list. Eckstein was traded from the Toronto Blue Jays for Minor League pitcher Chad Beck.

Despite the acquisitions, the team failed to improve and finished with a record of 82–80, in second place behind the Los Angeles Dodgers.

2009

In January 2009, team President Derrick Hall was named CEO as Jeff Moorad left the Diamondbacks to pursue an ownership bid with the San Diego Padres. Managing general partner Kendrick now became the public face of the ownership group and the operating head of the franchise. On May 8, after going 12–17 in 29 games, the Diamondbacks released manager Bob Melvin and hired A. J. Hinch. The season ended with the Diamondbacks in last place and a record of 70 wins and 92 losses. The Diamondbacks' tough year was blamed on a struggling offense, and an inadequate pitching staff which had a collective ERA of 4.18.

2010

The Diamondbacks ended the 2010 season with a 65–97 record. This poor performance was blamed on an extremely weak bullpen, which finished with a collective 5.47 ERA, and a lack of offense which was punctuated by the team setting the single season strikeout record. and ending the season with 1,529. On July 1, general manager Josh Byrnes and manager A. J. Hinch were fired and replaced on an interim basis by Jerry Dipoto and Kirk Gibson respectively. (Gibson was later named the manager on a permanent basis, but Dipoto was replaced by Kevin Towers)

2011: Worst to first

In a season projected by many to be a last place finish, the Arizona Diamondbacks bucked expectations maintaining playoff contention at the All Star break with a 49–43 record, only 3 games behind the 1st place San Francisco Giants. The Diamondbacks' success has been credited to the approach of manager Kirk Gibson as well as strong starting pitching behind Ian Kennedy, Daniel Hudson, Joe Saunders, and rookie Josh Collmenter as well as a much improved bullpen led by closer J. J. Putz.

The franchise opened Salt River Fields at Talking Stick, their new Spring training home in Scottsdale to rave reviews. The D-backs share the complex with the Colorado Rockies.

The Diamondbacks' ballpark, Chase Field played host to the 2011 All-Star game on July 12. This was highlighted by the first use of the designated hitter rule in a National League ballpark.

Toward the end of the trade deadline on July 31, 2011, the Diamondbacks acquired Washington Nationals right-handed pitcher Jason Marquis to strengthen their starting rotation, in exchange for Minor League shortstop Zach Walters. The day after, in a move to boost their bullpen strength, consistency and depth, the Diamondbacks acquired reliever Brad Ziegler from the Oakland Athletics in exchange for first baseman Brandon Allen and reliever Jordan Norberto.  On August 23, the Diamondbacks traded struggling second baseman Kelly Johnson to the Toronto Blue Jays for second baseman Aaron Hill and shortstop John McDonald.  The Diamondbacks surged after the All Star Break, posting a 45–25 record. On September 23, the Diamondbacks defeated the San Francisco Giants 3–1 to clinch the National League West division title.  They ended the season with a 94–68 record, a 29-game reversal over the prior year's performance. The Arizona Diamondbacks faced the Milwaukee Brewers in the 2011 National League Division Series, but lost 3–2 in the decisive game 5 in 10 innings.

2012

The Diamondbacks' 2012 season was less fruitful. The team did not have as much from team stars such as Ian Kennedy, Chris Young, Justin Upton, Stephen Drew, successor Daniel Hudson.  Hudson had season-ending Tommy John surgery, and Drew was traded to the Oakland A's for a couple of minor leaguers. On October 21, the D-backs traded Star Chris Young to the A's for a shortstop and used his salary and a minor league reliever to acquire closer Heath Bell from the Miami Marlins. The season did introduce new stars such as Wade Miley and Chris Johnson. Wade Miley was a rookie who led the team in wins and strike outs. He also broke the franchise record for most wins by a rookie. Chris Johnson was acquired in a trade with the Houston Astros. He hit 5 home runs including a grand slam in his first 10 games. Also, at the trade deadline, the D-backs tried to complete a "monster" trade with the Chicago Cubs that would include at the time, the league leader in E.R.A, Ryan Dempster. They didn't get the trade in time and lost Dempster to the Texas Rangers.

The Aaron Hill Era

Aaron Hill was a lesser known second baseman that the D-backs received from the Toronto Blue Jays in exchange for Kelly Johnson a few years before. In July 2012, Aaron Hill made history by becoming the first player to hit two cycles in one year during the modern era. He was the fourth to do so all time, joining the ranks of John Reilly, Babe Herman, and Tip O'Neill. He was also the fastest to do so, accomplishing this feat within of 2 weeks.

2013–present
In 2013, the Diamondbacks could not improve on their 81–81 season of 2012. They remained the same yet finished 2nd in the NL West. It marked the 3rd straight non-losing season which was their best streak since their early days of 1999–2003. Despite having some form of relevance, they managed to have a down year in 2014 with a Major League worst 64–98 record. 2015 marked the last season of Arizona's uniforms that were released prior to the 2007 season which resulted in an underwhelming but improved 79–83 record. 2016 saw a new change not only in uniforms but bringing back the teal color on the team colors as well. Star pitcher Zack Greinke from the Los Angeles Dodgers signed a 6-year, $206 million contract with the Diamondbacks and while his first year saw the team at 69–93, 10 games worse than last season, he helped with being a part of a growing team. Torey Lovullo was hired as the Diamondbacks' new manager after the season ended.

2017 marked the first playoff berth since 2011 and the first-ever wild card berth for Arizona. The Diamondbacks finished 93–69, a 24-game reversal of 2016. They faced the division rival Colorado Rockies in a thrilling wild card playoff which resulted in an 11–8 win to face the Dodgers in the NLDS. However their season came down to an end in a 3–0 sweep. 2018 marked another winning season at 82–80, a feat not achieved since 2007–08 but failed to qualify for consecutive playoff berths, finishing 3rd in the NL West.

The Diamondbacks had a mediocre start to 2019, reaching the end of July with a 54–55 record. They traded Greinke to the Houston Astros on July 31, but improved the following two months to finish second in the NL West at 85–77. In the pandemic-shortened 2020 season, the Diamondbacks fell to last place in the NL West with a 25–35 record. In 2021, the Diamondbacks posted a dismal 52–110 record, tied with the Baltimore Orioles for the worst in baseball that year and the second-worst in Diamondbacks history, just one loss behind 2004. Nevertheless, Lovullo's contract with Arizona was extended through the 2022 season, where the team finished fourth in the NL West with a 74–88 record.

References

Arizona Diamondbacks
Arizona Diamondbacks